Wei Rui is a Chinese Sanda kickboxer who currently fights out of Da Dong Xiang fight club.  On February 25, 2017, he won the K-1 World GP Lightweight Champions belt making him China's first K-1 World Champion.

As of September 2022, he is ranked the #3 featherweight and #7 pound-for-pound fighter in the world by Combat Press. He was the 2020 Combat Press "Male Fighter of the Year".

Background

Wei Rui was born on May 25, 1989 into a poor rural family as the youngest of eight siblings, with five sisters and two brothers in Luyi, Henan. The financial struggles of his family along with his disinterest in attending school led to him to pursue martial arts at the Luyi Shaolin Wenwu School. Here he trained and competed in Sanda for two years until he left the school to seek employment in order to support his family. With his martial arts background, Wei managed to get a job as a security guard when he moved to Beijing which he later quit after his dissatisfaction with the state of his career. This motivated him to travel to Liaoning and train at the Liaoyang Sports School to compete in Sanda once again. After winning a number of provincial championships he was invited back to the Luyi Shaolin Wenwu School in his home province to represent them in the 2010 and 2011 Shenzhen Sanda Boxing Association Championships winning both tournaments respectively. Wei's newfound success in Sanda led him to make the transition into competing internationally under kickboxing rules.

Career

Early career
Rui made his debut on September 13, 2013, against Charlie at Wu Lin Feng. He won the fight by knockout, after just three seconds. He would win his next three fights, before suffering his first professional loss to Lerdsila Chumpairtour, at Kunlun Fight 2, by unanimous decision.

He rebounded by winning his next five fights, before challenging Kaiwanlek Tor Laksong for the S1 Muaythai Super Lightweight International title. Kaiwanlek won by unanimous decision.

Wu Lin Feng
After this loss, Rui participated in the 2014 Wu Lin Feng tournament, to determine the 63 kg International champion. He beat Denis Puric by a second-round knockout in the semifinals, and Anson Chin by unanimous decision in the finals. Rui extended his winning streak to seven fights with knockout victories over DuoLra, Abdel Aziz Ennahachi and Josh Cunanan, as well as through decision victories over Yodsing Po.To.Oo.Pan hok and Casanova Lubo. He would then enter the 2015 WLF 63 kg Qualification tournament. Rui won the tournament with unanimous decision victories against Mahdi Mahmoudvand and Bohdan Kopkin in the semifinals and finals respectively.

After qualifying for the main tournament, Rui was scheduled to fight Chris Wells at the WLF New Zealand vs China event. Rui won the fight by unanimous decision. A month later, he was scheduled to fight Buray Bozaryilmaz, whom he beat by decision. Rui fought in Las Vegas for the first time during the WLF and WCK Muaythai crossover event, being scheduled to face Kronphet Phetrachapat. He beat Kronphet by split decision.

On December 5, 2015, Rui fought in the WLF World 63 kg Tournament. In the tournament semifinals, Rui defeated Pakorn PKSaenchaimuaythaigym by unanimous decision. Advancing to the finals, Rui faced Deng Zeqi. He beat Zeqi by a fourth-round TKO.

K-1 title reign
Rui continued his undefeated streak over the course of the next year, winning eleven straight fights, most notably winning a decision against the future Glory Featherweight Champion Petpanomrung Kiatmuu9. Rui then participated in the K-1 Lightweight Grand Prix, being scheduled to face Daizo Sasaki in the quarterfinals. He knocked out Sasaki, and won a unanimous decision against Cristian Spetcu in the semifinals. Advancing to the finals, he fought Ren Hiramoto, beating him by split decision.

Rui defended the title four months later, with a majority decision win against Gonnapar Weerasakreck.

On September 23, 2017, Rui fought Thanonchai Thanakorngym in the Glory of Heroes 63 kg tournament semifinals. He beat Thanonchai by unanimous decision.

During the Glory of Heroes: China VS Spain event, Rui was scheduled to fight Jesus Romero for the Superlightweight Strikers League World title. He beat Romero by unanimous decision.

During Glory of Heroes: Guangzhou, Rui scored a 60 second knockout of Phosa Nopphorn.

At K-1: K'FESTA.1, Rui was scheduled to make his second title defense, against the former K-1 Lightweight champion Koya Urabe. Urabe won the fight by knockout mid-way through the second round. It was the first knockout loss of Rui's career.

Return to Wu Lin Feng
On July 7, 2018, Rui fought a rematch with Deng Zeqi in the Glory of Heroes 63 kg Tournament finals. He once again beat Zeqi by stoppage, knocking him out in the second round. Three weeks later, Rui notched another knockout victory, stopping Sasa Jovanovic mid-way through the second round. At Glory of Heroes 34, he won a unanimous decision against Vadim Zadnipryanyi.

After five more victories under the GoH banner, Rui returned to Wu Lin Feng. He was scheduled to fight Wang Pengfei in his promotional return. He won the fight by unanimous decision. In his next three fights, Rui won decisions against Liu Xiangming, Zhao Chuanlin and Jia Aoqi.

On October 18, 2020, Rui fought Jin Ying for the Wu Lin Feng King's Super Cup Title. He beat Ying by unanimous decision.

Two months later, Rui was scheduled to fight Thodkhui MR.Manas, whom he beat by a second-round head kick knockout. Rui extended his undefeated streak to 15 fights with a unanimous decision victory over Zheng Junfeng. Rui was then scheduled to fight Liu Wei at Wu Lin Feng 516. Rui won the fight by an extra round decision.

Rui is expected to face DFS Lightweight Champion Adrian Maxim at Wu Lin Feng 2023: Chinese New Year on February 4, 2023.

Championships and awards

Kickboxing
Glory of Heroes
2018 GOH Junior Featherweight (-63kg) World Champion
K-1
K-1 Lightweight Champion -62.5 kg (first; 1 defense)
2017 K-1 World GP -62.5kg World Tournament Champion
Wu Lin Feng
2015 WLF World Championship Champions -63 kg
2014 WLF Men's intercontinental champion -63 kg
2013 Wu Lin Feng Rookie King Champions -60 kg 
2020 Wu Lin Feng King's Super Cup Champion
 2020 Wu Lin Feng Fighter of the Year
Strikers League
2017 Superlightweight Strikers League World Championship -63.5 kg
Amateur Kickboxing
2013 Chinese Kickboxing Championships  -67 kg
2012 Chinese Kickboxing Championships  -60 kg

Ranking
N°3 Combat Press.com at Bantamweight, April, 2018
N°5 Liver Kick.com at Featherweight, March 12, 2018

Sanda
Shenzhen Sanda Boxing Association
2011 Shenzhen Sanda Boxing Association International Tournament Champion 
2010 Shenzhen Sanda Boxing Association International Tournament Champion
Amateur Sanda
2007 Liaoning Provincial Sanda Championship  -60 kg
2008 National Youth Wushu Sanda Championship − 5th place

Accomplishments
Combatpress.com
2017 Combat Press Kickboxing Awards: Breakout Fighter of the Year
2020 Combat Press Kickboxing Awards: Male Fighter of the Year

eFight.jp
Fighter of the Month (February 2017)

Fight record

|-  style="background:#cfc;"
| 2023-02-04 || Win || align=left| Adrian Maxim || Wu Lin Feng 2023: Chinese New Year || Tangshan, China || Decision (Unanimous)|| 3 ||3:00 

|-  style="background:#cfc;"
| 2022-04-11 || Win || align=left| Phal Sophorn || Wu Lin Feng 529: Cambodia || Angkor, Cambodia || Decision || 3 || 3:00

|-  style="background:#cfc;"
| 2022-01-01 ||Win|| align=left| Sergei Lutchenko || Wu Lin Feng 527 || Tangshan, China || Decision (Unanimous) || 3 || 3:00

|-  style="background:#cfc;"
| 2021-10-30 ||Win || align=left| Moslem Lashani || Wu Lin Feng 2021: WLF on Haihua Island || Daizhou, China ||  TKO (Straight Left) || 1 || 2:02

|-  style="text-align:center; background:#cfc;"
| 2021-03-27 || Win || align=left| Liu Wei || Wu Lin Feng 2021: World Contender League 1st Stage || China || Ext.R Decision || 4 || 3:00

|-  style="text-align:center; background:#cfc;"
| 2021-01-23 || Win|| align=left| Zheng Junfeng || Wu Lin Feng 2021: Global Kung Fu Festival || Macao, China || Decision (Unanimous) || 3||3:00

|-  style="text-align:center; background:#cfc;"
| 2020-12-22 || Win || align=left| Thodkhui MR.Manas || Wu Lin Feng 2020: Women's 52kg Championship Tournament || Zhengzhou, China || KO (Left Head Kick) || 2 ||

|-  style="text-align:center; background:#cfc;"
| 2020-10-18 || Win || align=left| Jin Ying || Wu Lin Feng 2020: King's Super Cup Final || Zhengzhou, China || Decision (Unanimous) || 3 || 3:00
|-
! style=background:white colspan=9 |

|-  style="text-align:center; background:#cfc;"
| 2020-09-23 || Win || align=left| Jia Aoqi || Wu Lin Feng 2020: King's Super Cup 5th Group Stage || Zhengzhou, China || Decision (Unanimous) || 3 || 3:00

|-  style="text-align:center; background:#cfc;"
| 2020-09-05 || Win || align=left| Zhao Chuanlin || Huya Kung Fu Carnival 2 || Guangzhou, China || Decision (Unanimous) || 3 || 3:00

|-  style="text-align:center; background:#cfc;"
| 2020-08-03 || Win || align=left| Liu Xiangming || Wu Lin Feng 2020: King's Super Cup 4th Group Stage || Zhengzhou, China || Decision (Unanimous) || 3 || 3:00

|-  style="text-align:center; background:#cfc;"
| 2020-06-13 || Win || align=left| Wang Pengfei || Wu Lin Feng 2020: King's Super Cup 2nd Group Stage || Zhengzhou, China || Decision (Unanimous) || 3 || 3:00

|-  style="text-align:center; background:#cfc;"
| 2020-01-04 || Win||align=left| Domenico Lomurno || Glory Of Heroes 45 || Haikou, China || KO (Left Knee to the body)|| 2 || 2:02

|-  style="text-align:center; background:#cfc;"
| 2019-12-28 || Win||align=left| Ali Farahzad || Glory Of Heroes 44 || China || KO (Flying Left Head Kick)|| 2 || 2:08

|-  style="text-align:center; background:#cfc;"
| 2019-11-10 || Win||align=left| Vadim Gumerov || Glory Of Heroes 42 || Puyang, China || KO (Right Hook)|| 1 || 2:40

|-  style="text-align:center; background:#cfc;"
| 2019-05-25|| Win ||align=left| Simon Santana || Glory of Heroes 38: Shantou || Guangdong, China || Decision (Unanimous) || 3 || 3:00

|-
|-  style="text-align:center; background:#cfc;"
| 2018-09-15|| Win ||align=left| Vadim Zadnipryanyi || Glory of Heroes 34: Tongling || Anhui, China || Decision (Unanimous) || 3 || 3:00
|-
|-  style="text-align:center; background:#cfc;"
| 2018-07-28|| Win ||align=left| Sasa Jovanovic || Glory of Heroes 33: Shanghai || Shanghai, China || KO (Right Hook Kick) || 2 || 2:12
|-
|-  style="text-align:center; background:#cfc;"
| 2018-07-07 || Win ||align=left| Deng Zeqi || Glory of Heroes 32: Huizhou - GOH 63 kg Championship Tournament, Finals || Guangdong, China || KO (Left Knee to the Body) || 2 || 1:58
|-
! style=background:white colspan=9 |

|-  style="text-align:center; background:#fbb;"
| 2018-03-21 || Loss || align=left| Koya Urabe || K-1 World GP 2018: K'FESTA.1 || Saitama, Japan || KO (Straight Left) || 2 || 1:12
|-
! style=background:white colspan=9 |
|-
|-  style="text-align:center; background:#cfc;"
| 2018-01-13 || Win || align="left| Phosa Nopphorn || Glory of Heroes: Guangzhou || Guangzhou, China || KO (Right Hook) || 1 || 1:00
|- 
|-  style="text-align:center; background:#cfc;"
| 2017-11-11 || Win || align="left| Jesus Romero || Glory of Heroes: China VS Spain / Strikers League: Madrid || Madrid, Spain || Decision (Unanimous) || 3 || 3:00
|-
! style=background:white colspan=9 |
|-  style="text-align:center; background:#cfc;"
| 2017-09-23 || Win || align=left| Thanonchai Thanakorngym || Glory of Heroes: Luoyang - GOH 63 kg Championship Tournament, Semi-Finals || Luoyang, Henan || Decision (Unanimous) || 3 || 3:00
|-
|-  style="text-align:center; background:#cfc;"
| 2017-06-18 || Win || align=left| Kongnapa Weerasakreck || K-1 World GP 2017 Super Middleweight Championship Tournament || Tokyo, Japan || Decision (Majority) || 3 || 3:00
|-
! style=background:white colspan=9 |
|-
|-  style="text-align:center; background:#cfc;"
| 2017-04-28|| Win || align=left| Narongwut Kaeongam || Rise of Heroes: Chengde || Chengde, Hebei, China || TKO (Left Low Kick) || 2 ||
|- 
|-  style="text-align:center; background:#cfc;"
| 2017-02-25|| Win || align=left| Ren Hiramoto || K-1 World GP 2017 Lightweight Championship Tournament, Final || Tokyo, Japan || Decision (Split) || 3 || 3:00
|-
! style=background:white colspan=9 |

|-  style="text-align:center; background:#cfc;"
| 2017-02-25|| Win || align=left| Cristian Spetcu || K-1 World GP 2017 Lightweight Championship Tournament, Semi Finals || Tokyo, Japan || Decision (Unanimous) || 3 || 3:00
|- 
|-  style="text-align:center; background:#cfc;"
| 2017-02-25|| Win || align=left| Daizo Sasaki || K-1 World GP 2017 Lightweight Championship Tournament, Quarter Finals || Tokyo, Japan || KO (Left Hook) || 2 || 1:04
|- 
|-  style="text-align:center; background:#cfc;"
| 2017-01-14|| Win || align=left| Petpanomrung Kiatmuu9 || Glory of Heroes 6 || Jiyuan, China || Ex.R Decision (Unanimous) || 4 || 3:00
|- 
|-  style="text-align:center; background:#cfc;"
| 2016-10-29 || Win || align=left| Piyawong Kaliku || Rise of Heroes 3 || Changji, Xinjiang, China || TKO (Left Hook/Referee Stoppage) || 2 || 1:24
|- 
|-  style="text-align:center; background:#cfc;"
| 2016-10-01|| Win || align=left| Kaiwanlek Tor Laksong || Glory of Heroes 5 || Zhengzhou, China || TKO (Left Head Kick) || 3 ||
|- 
|-  style="text-align:center; background:#cfc;"
| 2016-09-17 || Win || align=left| Maksim Petkevich || Rise of Heroes 1 || Chaoyang, Liaoning, China || Ex.R Decision (Unanimous) || 4 || 3:00
|- 
|-  style="text-align:center; background:#cfc;"
| 2016-08-06 || Win || align=left| Matteo Taccini || Glory of Heroes 4 || Changzhi, China || Decision (Unanimous) || 3 || 3:00
|- 
|-  style="text-align:center; background:#cfc;"
| 2016-07-02 || Win || align=left| Khyzer Hayat Nawaz || Glory of Heroes 3 || Jiyuan, China || Decision (Unanimous) || 3 || 3:00
|- 
|-  style="text-align:center; background:#cfc;"
| 2016-06-04 || Win || align=left| Kenta Hayashi || Wu Lin Feng vs Krush || Zhengzhou, China || KO (Straight Left) || 3 ||
|- 
|-  style="text-align:center; background:#cfc;"
| 2016-05-07 || Win || align=left| Ban Yungsong || Glory of Heroes 2 || Shenzhen, China || Decision (Unanimous) || 3 || 3:00
|- 
|-  style="text-align:center; background:#cfc;"
| 2016-04-02 || Win || align=left| Yukiya Nakamura || Glory of Heroes 1 || Shenzhen, China || KO (Flying Knee) || 1 || 1:10
|- 
|-  style="text-align:center; background:#cfc;"
| 2016-03-05 || Win || align=left| Yusuke Shimada || Wu Lin Feng 2016 || Zhengzhou, China || KO (Left Head Kick) || 1 ||
|- 
|-  style="text-align:center; background:#cfc;"
| 2016-01-23 || Win || align=left| Pakorn PKSaenchaimuaythaigym || Wu Lin Feng 2016: World Kickboxing Championship in Shanghai || Shanghai, China || Decision (Unanimous) || 3 || 3:00 
|-
|-  style="text-align:center; background:#cfc;"
| 2015-12-05 || Win || align=left| Deng Zeqi || WLF World Championship 2015 -63 kg Tournament, Finals || Zhengzhou, China || TKO (Punches) || 4 ||
|-
! style=background:white colspan=9 |
|-  style="text-align:center; background:#cfc;"
| 2015-12-05 || Win || align=left| Pakorn PKSaenchaimuaythaigym || WLF World Championship 2015 -63 kg Tournament, Semi Finals || Zhengzhou, China || Decision (Unanimous) || 3 || 3:00 
|-
|-  style="text-align:center; background:#cfc;"
| 2015-11-13 || Win || align=left| Kronphet Phetrachapat || Wu Lin Feng & WCK Muaythai: China vs USA || Las Vegas, USA || Decision (Split) || 3 || 3:00 
|- 
|-  style="text-align:center; background:#cfc;"
| 2015-10-24 || Win || align=left| Buray Bozaryilmaz || Wu Lin Feng 2015 || Hong Kong, China || Decision (Unanimous) || 3 || 3:00 
|- 
|-  style="text-align:center; background:#cfc;"
| 2015-09-19 || Win || align=left| Chris Wells || Wu Lin Feng 2015 – New Zealand vs China  || Auckland, New Zealand || Decision (Unanimous) || 3 || 3:00 
|-
|-  style="text-align:center; background:#cfc;"
| 2015-08-01 || Win || align=left| Bohdan Kopkin || WLF World Championship 2015 -63 kg Tournament, Quarter Finals || Zhengzhou, China || Decision (Unanimous) || 3 || 3:00 
|-
! style=background:white colspan=9 |
|-  style="text-align:center; background:#cfc;"
| 2015-08-01 || Win || align=left| Mahdi Mahmoudvand || WLF World Championship 2015 -63 kg Tournament, First Round || Zhengzhou, China || Decision (Unanimous) || 3 || 3:00 
|-
|-  style="text-align:center; background:#cfc;"
| 2014-12-05 || Win || align=left| Yodsing Po.To.Oo.Pan hok || Wu Lin Feng 2014 – King’s Cup 2014 || Bangkok, Thailand || Decision (Unanimous) || 3 || 3:00
|-
|-  style="text-align:center; background:#cfc;"
| 2014-11-01 || Win || align=left| Josh Cunanan || Wu Lin Feng & WCK Muaythai: China vs USA || Las Vegas, USA || TKO (Straight Left/Referee Stoppage) || 1 ||
|-
|-  style="text-align:center; background:#cfc;"
| 2014-10-04 || Win || align=left| Casanova Lubo || Wu Lin Feng 2014 || Wenling, China || Decision (Unanimous) || 3 || 3:00
|-
|-  style="text-align:center; background:#cfc;"
| 2014-09-28 || Win || align=left| Abdel Aziz Ennahachi || Wu Lin Feng 2014 – Netherlands vs China || Zaandam, Netherlands || TKO (Left Low Kick) || 2 ||
|-
|-  style="text-align:center; background:#cfc;"
| 2014-09-09 || Win || align=left| DuoLra || Wu Lin Feng 2014 || Huoerguosi, China || KO (Right Hook Kick) || 1 || 
|-
|-  style="text-align:center; background:#cfc;"
| 2014-08-30 || Win || align=left| Qian Yizhong || Wu Lin Feng 2014 International Champion– 63 kg Tournament, Finals || Hong Kong, China || Decision (Unanimous) || 3 || 3:00
|-
! style=background:white colspan=9 | 
|-  style="text-align:center; background:#cfc;"
| 2014-08-30 || Win || align=left| Denis Puric || Wu Lin Feng 2014 International Champion– 63 kg Tournament, Semi Finals || Hong Kong, China || KO (Left Knee to the Body) || 2 ||
|-
|-  style="text-align:center; background:#fbb;"
| 2014-08-12 || Loss || align=left| Kaiwanlek Tor Laksong || Wu Lin Feng & Thailand Queen’s Cup 2014 || Bangkok, Thailand || Decision (Unanimous) || 3 || 3:00 
|-
! style=background:white colspan=9 |
|-  style="text-align:center; background:#cfc;"
| 2014-07-26 || Win || align=left| Nurgalliyev Hanaharti || Wu Lin Feng 2014 || Nur-Sultan, Kazakhstan || Decision (Unanimous) || 3 || 3:00 
|-
|-  style="text-align:center; background:#cfc;"
| 2014-06-14 || Win || align=left| David Wogan || Wu Lin Feng 2014 || Dublin, Ireland || TKO (Corner Stoppage) || 2 || 0:00
|-
|-  style="text-align:center; background:#cfc;"
| 2014-05-23 || Win || align=left| Longchai || Wu Lin Feng 2014 || Luoyang, China || KO (Right hook to the Body) ||  || 
|-
|-  style="text-align:center; background:#cfc;"
| 2014-05-10 || Win || align=left| Johann Dederer || Wu Lin Feng 2014 -  Day of Destruction 8 || Hamburg, Germany || TKO (Left Low Kicks) || 1 || 
|-
|-  style="text-align:center; background:#cfc;"
| 2014-03-07 || Win || align=left| Tucker || Wu Lin Feng 2014 || Hangzhou, China || Decision (Unanimous) || 3 || 3:00 
|-
|-  style="text-align:center; background:#fbb;"
| 2014-02-16 || Loss || align=left| Lerdsila Chumpairtour || Wu Lin Feng & Kunlun Fight 2 & MAX Muay Thai 6 || Zhengzhou, China || Decision (Unanimous) || 3 || 3:00 
|-
|-  style="text-align:center; background:#cfc;"
| 2014-01-26 || Win || align=left| Francis || Wu Lin Feng 2014 || Beijing, China || TKO ||  || 
|-
|-  style="text-align:center; background:#cfc;"
| 2013-12-02 || Win || align=left| Walloon Gaish || Wu Lin Feng 2013 || Bengbu, China || Decision (Unanimous) || 3 || 3:00 
|-
|-  style="text-align:center; background:#cfc;"
| 2013-10-12 || Win || align=left| Emma || Wu Lin Feng 2013 || Zhengzhou, China || TKO (Left Spinning Back Fist) || 2 ||
|-
|-  style="text-align:center; background:#cfc;"
| 2013-09-13 || Win || align=left| Charlie || Wu Lin Feng 2013 || Wenzhou, China || KO || 1 || 0:03 
|-
| colspan=9 | Legend:

Mixed martial arts record

|-
|Loss
|align=center| 0–1
|Adib Nazrishoev
|Submission (Rear Naked Choke)
|Glory of Heroes 35: Meishan
|
|align=center| 1
|align=center| 3:41
|Sichuan, China
|

Mixed rules record

|-
| 
| align=center| 0–0-1
|  Jeffrey Kelly
| Draw
| Glory Of Heroes 37: New Zealand
| 
| align=center|4
| align=center|2:00
| New Zealand
| 
|-

External links
 Official K-1 profile
 Official GOH profile

References 

Chinese male kickboxers
Lightweight kickboxers
Featherweight kickboxers
1989 births
Living people
Chinese sanshou practitioners
People from Zhoukou
Sportspeople from Henan
Chinese wushu practitioners
Chinese male mixed martial artists
Mixed martial artists utilizing sanshou